is a Japanese manga series written and illustrated by Keiko Iwashita. It was serialized in Dessert from December 2016 to June 2021.

Publication
The series is written and illustrated by Keiko Iwashita. It started serialization in Dessert on December 24, 2016. The first volume was released on May 12, 2017. The series ended in June 24, 2021. The eleventh tankōbon volume is the final volume.

At Anime NYC 2017, Kodansha USA announced they licensed the series digitally. At Anime Expo 2019, they announced a print release for the series.

Volume list

Reception
Sarah from Anime UK News praised the series, calling the art "attractively drawn" and the plot a "realistic portrayal" of what it was trying to depict. Rebecca Silverman from Anime News Network also praised the series for its plot and artwork, while criticizing some of the characters. Michelle Smith from Manga Bookshelf also offered praise for the art, while disagreeing with Silverman on the characters, stating that they liked them.

The series has 2 million copies in print.

References

External links
 

Kodansha manga
Romance anime and manga
Shōjo manga
Slice of life anime and manga